TLC is a television channel broadcasting to several countries in Latin America. It was originally known as Discovery Travel & Adventure Channel and featured more adventure-related programmes. On February 1, 2005, the channel changed its name to Discovery Travel & Living and changed to lifestyle programming about travel, food, design, architecture and luxury. On November 1, 2011, it was relaunched as "TLC: Travel & Living Channel" as part of the international roll-out of the TLC brand and the premiere of additional programming. In late 2012, "Travel & Living Channel" was dropped from the channel's name and replaced with the Discovery logo on the channel's logo.

Operating channels
 TLC Latin America (Spanish Audio, with English SAP in some areas)
 TLC Brazil (dedicated feed for Brazil, with Portuguese audio or subtitles and local advertisements, adjusted for the local time zone, but with basically the same programming as its Spanish-language counterpart)
 TLC HD (instead of being a full simulcast of TLC, the all-HD channel features programming from TLC and Discovery Home & Health, with a single feed to the entire region, with separate audio and subtitle channels in Spanish and Portuguese. However, on March 16, 2015, the Brazilian version of TLC HD merged in full simulcast with TLC Brazil and the former TLC HD was replaced by a new all-HD channel called Discovery World, which maintained the same programming of the old channel)

Programming
Programmes broadcast on the channel include:
 Anthony Bourdain: Sin Reservas
 Comidas Exoticas con Andrew Zimmern
 Top 5: Latino America (Original Latin American Production)
 Mas que una fiesta (Original Latin American Production)
 Los Coctel Boys
 Kylie Kwong: Pura Magia
 Asia: sabor y Cultura
 Destino: Luna de miel
 Sobreviví un Desafio Japonés
 Trotamundos
 Ciudades y Copas (Original Latin American Production)
 La vuelta al mundo en 80 sabores (Original Latin American Production)
 1000 lugares que ver antes de morir
 Cake Boss
 Cupcake Wars
 Hell's Kitchen U.S.
 MasterChef Australia
 MasterChef Peru
 Junior MasterChef Australia
 Miami Ink
 LA Ink
 NY Ink
 Sarah Palin's Alaska
 Earthtripping
 Mitos Culinarios
 Kitchen Boss
 Chef al rescate
 Maestros Cerveceros
 Getaway
 ROAM
 A la deriva con Cash Peters
 Dynamo: Magician Impossible
 Kitchen Boss
 Chopped
 My Big Fat American Gypsy Wedding
 The Great Food Truck Race
 Here Comes Honey Boo Boo

See also
TLC (TV network)
Discovery Travel & Living

References

External links
 TLC website for Spanish-speaking countries
 TLC website for Brazil

Television networks in Brazil
Television networks in Mexico
Latin America